Greg Ebrill (born 25 May 1979) is an Australian former professional rugby league footballer who played in the 1990s and 2000s. He played for the Manly Warringah Sea Eagles, Northern Eagles, and Salford City Reds he primarily played  forward.

Playing career
Ebrill made his first grade debut for the Manly Warringah Sea Eagles from the bench in his side's 28−22 victory over the North Sydney Bears at North Sydney Oval in round 20 of the 1999 season. With the dissolution of the Sea Eagles at season's end, Ebrill's stint at the Sea Eagles ended at the conclusion of the 1999 season, He played 6 games for the Sea Eagles.

In 2000, Ebrill joined the newly formed Northern Eagles following the Seas Eagles' merger. He played his last game for the Eagles in his side's 38-22 loss to eventual minor premiers the Parramatta Eels at Parramatta Stadium in round 25 of the 2001 season. After two seasons in which the Northern Eagles merger was wracked by internal strife and poor team performances, Ebrill left the Northern Eagles at the end of the 2001 season. He played 33 games and scored 1 try for the Northern Eagles.

In 2002, Ebrill joined English Super League side, the Salford City Reds. After playing 22 games and scoring 1 try for the Reds, Ebrill left Salford at the end of the 2002 Super League season.

Post playing
Following his retirement from rugby league, Ebrill has since worked as a construction worker in the Newcastle area.

References

1979 births
Living people
Australian rugby league players
Manly Warringah Sea Eagles players
Northern Eagles players
Salford Red Devils players
Rugby league utility players
Rugby league second-rows
Rugby league locks
Rugby league players from Newcastle, New South Wales